Amin Mohammad Jamali (born 25 January 1977) is an Iranian photojournalist and sports photographer. He is a contributor for Getty Images, and contributing with Vogue, The New York Times, The Times, The Guardian and ESPN.

He has been among the finalists of the first edition of the AIPS Sport Media Awards from Asia and Oceania, the organizers have announced. In 2019, he joined ATP Images Co. founded by Arthur Thill in 1983 in Munich, Germany.

Major Events Covered 

 2010 FIFA World Cup – South Africa
 AFC Asian Cup 2011 – Qatar
 AFC Asian Cup 2019 - UAE
 2014 FIFA World Cup – Brazil
 2018 FIFA World Cup – Russia
 2012 Summer Olympic Games – London
 2016 Summer Olympic Games – Rio de Janeiro
 2018 Winter Olympic Games – PyeongChang
 2011 FIFA Women World Cup – Germany
 UEFA Euro 2012 – Ukraine & Netherlands
 UEFA Euro 2016 – France
 Vogue Fashion 2015 – Dubai
 Vogue Event 2016 – Turin

References

Iranian photographers
Iranian photojournalists
People from Tehran
Living people
1977 births